Elina Colomer (1922–1987) was an Argentine film actress.

Selected filmography
 When Spring Makes a Mistake (1944)
 Our Natacha (1944)
 Lost Kisses (1945)
 Los secretos del buzón (1948)
 An Almost Merry Widow (1950)
 Juan Mondiola (1950)
 My Divine Poverty (1951)
 The Count of Monte Cristo (1953)
 The Falcón Family (1963)
 La familia hippie (1971)

References

Bibliography
 Goble, Alan. The Complete Index to Literary Sources in Film. Walter de Gruyter, 1999.

External links

1922 births
1987 deaths
Argentine film actresses
People from Buenos Aires